Clocortolone pivalate (brand names Cilder, Cloderm, Purantix), also known as clocortolone trimethylacetate, is a synthetic glucocorticoid corticosteroid and corticosteroid ester which is marketed in the United States and Austria. It is the C21 pivalate (trimethylacetate) ester of clocortolone, and acts as a prodrug of clocortolone in the body.

References

Secondary alcohols
Chloroarenes
Corticosteroid esters
Fluoroarenes
Glucocorticoids
Pivalate esters
Pregnanes
Prodrugs